Fairmount Township is one of thirteen townships in Grant County, Indiana, United States. As of the 2010 census, its population was 4,239 and it contained 1,909 housing units.

Geography
The streams of Back Creek, Winslow Ditch, Barren Creek, Fowlerton Drain, New Prairie Creek and Van Run run through this township. Lake Galatia, the southernmost natural lake in Indiana, lies in this township.

Cities and towns
 Fairmount
 Fowlerton

Adjacent townships
 Mill Township (north)
 Jefferson Township (east)
 Washington Township, Delaware County (southeast)
 Van Buren Township, Madison County (south)
 Boone Township, Madison County (southwest)
 Liberty Township (west)

Cemeteries
The township contains two cemeteries: Bethel and Park.

Major highways

Education
Fairmount Township residents may obtain a free library card from the Fairmount Public Library in Fairmount.

References
 
 United States Census Bureau cartographic boundary files

External links

Townships in Grant County, Indiana
Townships in Indiana